Roughton Road railway station is on the Bittern Line in Norfolk, England, on the outskirts of the town of Cromer. It takes its name from the street on which it is located, and is several miles north of the village of Roughton.

It is a modern halt station that was opened by British Rail in 1985. Today it is managed by Greater Anglia, which also operates all passenger trains that call. It is unstaffed and consists of a single platform.

The station is approximately half a mile from the site of a closed station called , the former terminus of the Great Eastern Railway (GER), and is located on the site of the former junction between the GER and the Norfolk and Suffolk Joint Railway, at the entrance to the disused Cromer Tunnel.

Services
, the typical off-peak service at Roughton Road is one train every two hours in each direction between Norwich and Sheringham. In peak hours, service frequency is increased to one train per hour.

External links

See also
 Railway stations in Cromer

Railway stations in Norfolk
DfT Category F2 stations
Railway stations opened by British Rail
Railway stations in Great Britain opened in 1985
Greater Anglia franchise railway stations